Yulius Pamungkas (born 16 July 2000) is an Indonesian professional footballer who plays as a full-back for Liga 1 club Persis Solo.

Club career

Persis Solo
He was signed for Persis Solo to play in Liga 2 in the 2021 season. Yulius made his league debut on 31 July 2022 in a match against Persija Jakarta at the Patriot Candrabhaga Stadium, Bekasi.

Career statistics

Club

Notes

Honours

Club
Belitong
 Liga 3 Bangka Belitung: 2021

References

External links
 Yulius Pamungkas at Soccerway
 Yulius Pamungkas at Persissolo.id

2000 births
Living people
Indonesian footballers
Liga 1 (Indonesia) players
Liga 2 (Indonesia) players
Persis Solo players
People from Sukoharjo Regency
Sportspeople from Central Java
Association football defenders